Lennart Koskinen (born November 12, 1944 in Helsinki), is a clergyman in the Church of Sweden. He was Bishop of Visby between 2003 and 2011.

Koskinen is a member of the Elijah Interfaith Institute Board of World Religious Leaders.

References 

1944 births
Living people
Clergy from Helsinki
Finnish emigrants to Sweden
Swedish people of Finnish descent
Bishops of Visby